Leslie Waters (born August 24, 1947) in St. Petersburg, Florida.

Leslie Waters served as a State Representative in the Florida House of Representatives for 8 years (1998-2006), terming out as Speaker Pro-Tempore. She has served on the City of Seminole Council for 10 years, as Councilor, Vice Mayor, Interim Mayor, and currently as Mayor since 2013. She is the proprietor of Leslie Waters Government Relations, travels as an International Democracy Consultant, author of Good Morning Mayor, What's up? a book about local government, the government closest to the people. She received both her Bachelor's and master's degrees from Florida State University, and lives in Seminole, Florida with her husband, Al Waters.

External links
 Official Bio for Mayor Waters

Florida State University alumni
Republican Party members of the Florida House of Representatives
1947 births
Living people
Women state legislators in Florida
21st-century American women